The 1956 Wimbledon Championships took place on the outdoor grass courts at the All England Lawn Tennis and Croquet Club in Wimbledon, London, United Kingdom. The tournament was held from Monday 25 June until Saturday 7 July 1956. It was the 70th staging of the Wimbledon Championships, and the third Grand Slam tennis event of 1956. Lew Hoad and Shirley Fry won the singles titles.

Champions

Seniors

Men's singles

 Lew Hoad defeated  Ken Rosewall, 6–2, 4–6, 7–5, 6–4

Women's singles

 Shirley Fry defeated  Angela Buxton, 6–3, 6–1

Men's doubles

 Lew Hoad /  Ken Rosewall defeated  Nicola Pietrangeli /  Orlando Sirola, 7–5, 6–2, 6–1

Women's doubles

 Angela Buxton /  Althea Gibson defeated  Fay Muller /  Daphne Seeney, 6–1, 8–6

Mixed doubles

 Vic Seixas /  Shirley Fry defeated  Gardnar Mulloy /  Althea Gibson, 2–6, 6–2, 7–5

Juniors

Boys' singles

 Ronnie Holmberg defeated  Rod Laver, 6–1, 6–1

Girls' singles

 Ann Haydon defeated  Ilse Buding, 6–3, 6–4

References

External links
 Official Wimbledon Championships website

 
Wimbledon Championships
Wimbledon Championships
Wimbledon Championships
Wimbledon Championships